Denys Viktorovych Harmash (born 19 April 1990) is a Ukrainian footballer who plays as a midfielder for Dynamo Kyiv.

Career

Club

International
On 7 October 2011, Harmash made his debut for the senior side of his country in the 3:0 home win against Bulgaria in an exhibition match.

Career statistics

Club

International

International goals

Scores and results list Ukraine's goal tally first.

Honours
Dynamo Kyiv
 Ukrainian Premier League: 2014–15, 2015–16, 2020–21
 Ukrainian Cup: 2013–14, 2014–15, 2019–20, 2020–21
 Ukrainian Super Cup: 2009, 2011, 2016, 2018, 2019, 2020

Ukraine U19
 UEFA European Under-19 Championship: 2009

Personal
Harmash's car was shot at in Kyiv on 5 December 2017, no casualties were reported.

References

External links
 
 

1990 births
Living people
Ukrainian footballers
Association football midfielders
Piddubny Olympic College alumni
Ukraine youth international footballers
Ukraine under-21 international footballers
Ukraine international footballers
FC Dynamo-2 Kyiv players
FC Dynamo-3 Kyiv players
FC Dynamo Kyiv players
Çaykur Rizespor footballers
Ukrainian Premier League players
Ukrainian First League players
Ukrainian Second League players
Süper Lig players
UEFA Euro 2012 players
UEFA Euro 2016 players
Ukrainian expatriate footballers
Expatriate footballers in Turkey
Ukrainian expatriate sportspeople in Turkey
Sportspeople from Luhansk Oblast